Armed Forces Engineering Authority is one of the Egyptian Ministry of Defense agencies.

Tasks 
Contribute in the areas of development in Egypt and the establishment of major development projects
Contribute to remove the effects of local disasters and crises
Participation of in the aftermath of a major disaster to remove the effects (to reconstruct)
Participation in infrastructure and construction of bridges, roads and fields
Participation in education by building schools
Participation in the fields of psychology and clearing of land mines and explosive remnants of war
Participation in the areas of political development and the development of sports facilities
Supply the civil sector effective cadres
Participation in the area of economic housing
General planning of cities and the creation of Bedouin villages and Nubian houses
Remove the effects of disasters and floods and earthquakes, removing bombs and booby traps

References

Construction and civil engineering companies of Egypt
Defence agencies of Egypt
Military engineering